The 2022 Boston Pizza Cup presented by Best Western, the provincial men's curling championship for Alberta, was held January 3 to 9 at the Bonnetts Energy Centre in Grande Prairie, Alberta. The winning Kevin Koe team represented Alberta at the 2022 Tim Hortons Brier in Lethbridge, Alberta. The event was held in conjunction with the 2022 Alberta Scotties Tournament of Hearts, the provincial women's curling championship.

Qualification process

Teams
The teams are listed as follows:

Knockout brackets

Source:

A event

B event

C event

Knockout results
All draw times are listed in Mountain Time (UTC-07:00).

Draw 1
Monday, January 3, 2:00 pm

Draw 2
Tuesday, January 4, 9:00 am

Draw 3
Tuesday, January 4, 7:00 pm

Draw 4
Wednesday, January 5, 9:00 am

Draw 5
Wednesday, January 5, 7:00 pm

Draw 6
Thursday, January 6, 9:00 am

Draw 7
Thursday, January 6, 7:00 pm

Draw 8
Friday, January 7, 9:00 am

Draw 9
Friday, January 7, 7:00 pm

Playoffs

A vs. B
Saturday, January 8, 9:00 am

C1 vs. C2
Saturday, January 8, 9:00 am

Semifinal
Saturday, January 8, 8:00 pm

Final
Sunday, January 9, 4:30 pm

Notes

References

External links

2022 in Alberta
Curling in Alberta
2022 Tim Hortons Brier
January 2022 sports events in Canada
Sport in Grande Prairie